The  IPT-1 Gafanhoto (Brazilian-Portuguese name for the grasshoppers), was a Brazilian single-seat, monoplane glider aircraft designed and manufactured for general flying.

Design and development
The IPT-1 was designed by engineer Frederico Abranches Brotero, and christened by him, with a name that matched its attitude in flight, since it was developed for short flights, towed in the launch by a car. The decision to make it incapable of executing long, high-altitude flights was motivated by making it an ideal piece of equipment for practicing and observing beginners by their instructors.

Construction
Completely wooden structure, it had an open fuselage cabin. Fuselage and wings extremely covered with canvas and plywood. It had fastening uprights under the wings, a central slider along the entire fuselage. It was completed in 1942, and flew regularly in São Paulo for more than two years. The wings were deployed 20cm higher than originally planned. Because of this, the IPT-1 used to crash when the landing was not done well. In flight, however, it reacted correctly to commands.

Specifications

See also

 Elliotts Primary EoN
 I.Ae. 41 Urubú
 Neiva B Monitor

References

External links
IPT’s official site

High-wing aircraft
1940s Brazilian sailplanes
Aircraft first flown in 1942
Glider aircraft